N. Srinivasan (born 29 January 2013) is an Indian digital artist in the fields of art and architecture. He uses technology and traditional subject matter for most of his artwork.

Early life
Srinivasan was born on 24 January 1972 in the Saivite family in a small Thanjavur village, in Rajamannarkudi. In his younger years, the rich artistic tradition of his village influenced his visual education, and the cultural and artistic rituals of his native village are now integral to his identity.

In 1996 he completed his Bachelor in Fine Arts at the Government College of Arts and Crafts in Chennai. He obtained both a Master of Arts and Master in Philosophy in Public Administration. He completed his Master's Degree in Fine Arts on Painting at the Government College of Fine Arts, studying at Tamil Nadu Music and Fine Arts University, Chennai, in 2016.

Career
Srinivasan moved from traditional tools to expressing his emotions and sentiments by engaging with digital technology. He studied Saiva Siddhanta for three years at the Thiruvaduthurai Mutt and obtained the title "siddantha Ratnam." He adds philosophic preferences and welfares from Saiva Siddhanta to his artistic creations. His works have been showcased as drawings, digital prints, installations, videos and three-dimensional sculptures. He says, "Each work of art takes, at a minimum, 250 to 450 hours to create and is an intense and laborious process". Srinivasan created the unique colours of Java Green, Sriblue, 369Red, KurinjiViolet, and CholaBrown.

He works at the School of Architecture and Planning, Anna University, Chennai. He has participated in many national painting camps, such as a workshop on Non Toxic and Safe Etching Processes, from 13 to 16 September 2005, at Lalit Kala Akademi Chennai by Chayo De Chevez, the American print maker.

In 2016 he formed an Integrated Village for Arts to enable younger generations to learn about ancient paintings and artistic treasures. 
In 2005, Srinivasan had a vision about starting a university for fine arts and he wrote about this in the Tamil Magazine Amuthasurabhi.
This vision became reality, as the Tamil Nadu government has announced the start up of the new Tamil Nadu Music and Fine Arts University in November 2013.
The artist has expressed his concern about the ancient rock arts that are extinct in Villupuram district and he has started a Council to protect the wrangling of archaeological arts with three of his friends.

Art shows
 Art Exhibition at Jehangir Art Gallery, Mumbai 4 to 10 May 2015
He has acted as Curator for Tsunami Art Exhibition by NSS Students of 230 Engineering Colleges at Anna University Chennai on 13 September 2005. 
Thane Art Show by Vikatan in 2012
Art Show at Hyderabad-2005     
Art Show in Lakshana Art Gallery – 2008 		
Art Exhibition at Chennai – 2010   
Chennai Art in the Age of Globalisation- by Ashrafi S. Baghat – 2009  
Gallery at Sri Parvati   
Middle Order – Art Exhibition at Gallery sriParvati – 2010
Abstraction – Art Show in Coimbatore – 2012 
 Vinnyasa Premier Art Gallery's 'Access Art' show −2008
Lakshana Art Gallery in 2008 
Artworks at top selling artistic painting portal
 Hues Art Gallery 
 Group shows

Awards
 Kalaimamani, Tamil Nadu State Government Award in 2009.The Kalaimamani award, instituted by The Tamil Nadu Iyal Isai Nataka Manram, is conferred on N. Srinivasan, the Performing Artist with Lasting Contribution, Popularity and Merit of the Art Discipline of Painting in the year 2009, for his Outstanding Achievements in the Field of Digital Painting. He is the only person to have received the Kalimamani award in the Field of Painting.  

 N. Srinivasan and V. Senguttuvan are conferred with APJ Abdul Kalam Memorial Research Award - 2016 in Fine Arts UBN: 015-A94510112024
 Chennai City Award for Painting by PDFA Mumbai – 2016.
 Certificate of Merit – 28th National Exhibition of Contemporary Art - South Central Zone Cultural Centre, Nagpur – 2015.
 Tamil Nadu State Award for Printmaking by PDFA Mumbai - 2015.
 2nd All India Art Contest 2009 Award POPNI Puducherry 3 March 2010.
 Sekizhar Award by Madras Metropolitan Sekizhar Educational & Cultural Trust Jan 2010.
 Outstanding Cultural Achievement Award in 2005 by Madras Jaycees.
 Achievement in Fine Art – "Silver Jubilee Year Honour" at Sirkali on 27 February 2005.
 Nominated for Indira Gandhi National Award for Social Work in 2005.
 NSS Programme Officer Special Award for the year 2003–2004 in 2004.

Publications
He is interested in Tamil writings. 

His Tamil novel "Vidambanam" was released by Kaalachuvadu publications in 2017. Nammoduthan Pesugirargal was co-authored by N. Srinivasan. He has also published in Muse India. He published a technical paper on machine learning at the IEEE International Conference in 2015. 

Two Tamil books (Tamil Poems – Minpura Kavithaikal, Braille – Yil Uriayum Nagaram) were published by him through his MeiPorul Publications, and the books were released by  DR. K. Rosaiah, Governor of Tamil Nadu at Raj Bhavan, Chennai (20 December 2014). The first copy of the book Minpura Kavithaikal was received by Thiru Ramesh Chand Meena, IAS, Secretary to Governor. 

He publishes the Tamil little magazine, Mei Porul which focuses on art and aesthetics related issues. 

In 2016 the artist joined Kanaiyazhi, fifty years old monthly Tamil Literary magazine, as a member of Authors.

Membership
He is a life member in the Indian Society for Technical Education, the South Zone Cultural Center Thanjavur, the Bombay Art Society Mumbai, and the Jehangir Art Gallery of Mumbai.

Further reading 

Srinivasan's interview:இயக்கங்களின் வீழ்ச்சியும் தனிமனித உரையாடல்களின் எழுச்சியும்
 Srinivasan's articles at Tamil Hindu: நாவல் விடம்பனம் : வண்ணங்களிலிருந்து வார்த்தைகளுக்கு ஒரு பயணம்
Srinivasan's articles at Tamil Hindu:அஞ்சலி: சிற்பி எஸ்.நந்தகோபால் – இந்தியாவின் சிற்ப முகம்
 About the artist and fiction writer in Kungumam.
 Writer Perumaal Murugan about the Artist
Journey into silence – Dr.Ashrafi S. Bhagat 
Unchanged Heroes – Vaishnavi Ramanathan (freelance writer and researcher)
Digital Visual Fare: The Artistic Trajectory of N. Srinivasan – Dr. Ashrafi, S. Bhagat
Into the Digital World of Art – Venkat Swaminathan (Art Critic)
Nirangalaal Ezhuthiya Kavithaigal – Pavannan (writer)

About an article written by N. Srinivasan in Pudhiya Paarvai

References

External links 

Digital artists
Indian multimedia artists
Living people
1972 births
Recipients of the Kalaimamani Award
Indian male artists
Artists from Tamil Nadu
People from Thanjavur district